Solway may refer to:

Places

Australia
Solway, a neighbourhood of Ashburton, Victoria. a suburb of Melbourne

New Zealand
Solway, New Zealand, a suburb of Masterton

United Kingdom
Solway Firth, the inlet between the north west of England and southern Scotland
Solway Coast, designated Area of Outstanding Natural Beauty in northern Cumbria
Solway Moss, lowland peat bog in Cumbria, England, near the Scottish border
Battle of Solway Moss, 1542 battle between England and Scotland
Solway Plain, stretching from the edge of the northern fells of Cumbria (England) to the Solway Firth and for some miles around Carlisle, and also along the Scottish border of the Firth

United States
Solway, Minnesota
Solway Township, St. Louis County, Minnesota
Solway, Tennessee

People with the surname
David Solway, Canadian poet
Larry Solway, Canadian actor and broadcaster

Ships
ST Solway, a tug
Solway Lass, a tall ship
Solway Harvester, a commercial trawler sunk off the Isle of Man in January 2000

Other
Solway Star F.C., a defunct Scottish football club
Solway Group, a Swiss company

Solvay (disambiguation)